Albert Street railway station is a railway station currently under construction as part of the Cross River Rail project in the Brisbane central business district, Queensland, Australia.

To be built as an underground station directly beneath Albert Street, it will consist of two platforms. Construction commenced in October 2019, with it scheduled to open in 2024.  The platforms are built at a depth of 31 metres.

The station will provide access to the mixed-use residential, employment and retail precinct adjoining the City Botanic Gardens, the financial district, Queen’s Wharf, the government precinct and Queensland University of Technology at Gardens Point.  The precinct is expected to attract more than 67,000 commuters each weekday in 2036.

The station has two entrances.  The main entrance lies to the south, while the second entrance is located to the north.

Construction
Because of difficult ground conditions drill and blast techniques were used to excavate space for the station. The design features two shafts between the surface and platform level. The elevator shaft for the platform reaches a depth of 50 metres, making it the deepest basement in Brisbane.  During construction needles used for opium smoking, as well as boots, ceramics and coins were unearthed. During construction, 47,305 cubic metres of spoil was removed. Excavation of the station box was completed in April 2022.

See also

Queensland Rail City network
Rail transport in South East Queensland
Transport in Brisbane

References

External links

Albert Street, Brisbane
Proposed railway stations in Australia
Railway stations scheduled to open in 2024
Railway stations located underground in Australia